Capelli is an Italian surname meaning hair (plural). Notable people with the surname include:

Adler Capelli (born 1973), Italian former track cyclist
Alfredo Capelli (1855–1910), Italian mathematician
Andy Capelli, fictional character on General Hospital
Ather Capelli (1902–1944), Italian journalist
Camillo Capelli, also called Camillo Mantovano, (active 16th century), Italian painter of the Renaissance period
Claudio Capelli (born 1986), Swiss artistic gymnast
Daniele Capelli (born 1986), Italian footballer
Ermanno Capelli  (born 1985), Italian professional road racing cyclist
Francis Alphonse Capelli the real name of Frank A. Capell (1907–1980), American author and essayist
Francesco Capelli (active c. 1568), Italian painter
Ivan Capelli (born 1963), Italian former Formula One driver
Javier Capelli (born 1985), Argentine footballer 
Joseph Capelli, fictional character in Resistance, and main protagonist in Resistance 3 
Monia Capelli (born 1969), former Italian long-distance runner
Pietro Capelli (circa 1700–1724 or 1727), Italian painter of the Rococo
Vincenzo Capelli (born 1988), Italian rower

See also
Capelli's identity in mathematics
Capelli Sport, an American sportswear company

Italian-language surnames